In mathematics of stochastic systems, the Runge–Kutta method is a technique for the approximate numerical solution of a stochastic differential equation. It is a generalisation of the Runge–Kutta method for ordinary differential equations to stochastic differential equations (SDEs).  Importantly, the method does not involve knowing derivatives of the coefficient functions in the SDEs.

Most basic scheme

Consider the Itō diffusion  satisfying the following Itō stochastic differential equation

with initial condition , where  stands for the Wiener process, and suppose that we wish to solve this SDE on some interval of time . Then the basic Runge–Kutta approximation to the true solution  is the Markov chain  defined as follows:

 partition the interval  into   subintervals of width : 
 set ;
The random variables  are independent and identically distributed normal random variables with expected value zero and variance .

This scheme has strong order 1, meaning that the approximation error of the actual solution at a fixed time scales with the time step . It has also weak order 1, meaning that the error on the statistics of the solution scales with the time step . See the references for complete and exact statements.

The functions  and  can be time-varying without any complication. The method can be generalized to the case of several coupled equations; the principle is the same but the equations become longer.

Variation of the Improved Euler is flexible

A newer Runge—Kutta scheme also of strong order 1 straightforwardly reduces to the improved Euler scheme for deterministic ODEs.  
Consider the vector stochastic process  that satisfies the general Ito SDE

where drift  and volatility  are sufficiently smooth functions of their arguments.

 where  for normal random ; 
 and where , each alternative chosen with probability .

The above describes only one time step.

The scheme integrates Stratonovich SDEs to  provided one sets  throughout (instead of choosing ).

Higher order Runge-Kutta schemes

Higher-order schemes also exist, but become increasingly complex.
Rößler developed many schemes for Ito SDEs,
whereas Komori developed schemes for Stratonovich SDEs. Rackauckas extended these schemes to allow for adaptive-time stepping via Rejection Sampling with Memory (RSwM), resulting in orders of magnitude efficiency increases in practical biological models, along with coefficient optimization for improved stability.

References

Numerical differential equations
Stochastic differential equations